This is a list of the rulers and officers of Galway, Ireland from 1230 to 1485.

List

See also
List of mayors of Galway (from 1485 to present)

Sources
 "History of Galway", James Hardiman, 1820.
 "Blake Family Records", Vol. I, Martin J. Blake, 1902.

History of Galway (city)
Galway
rulers